Newtimber Place is a Grade I listed building in the Mid Sussex district of West Sussex, England. The house sits on a D-shaped island in a moat. The oldest part of the house dates from the 16th century.

The north wing is apparently the oldest part of the building, dating from the 16th century. It was considerably extended in the 17th century by the addition of the east wing. The house is built from flint and red brick with stone quoins.

The grounds are in the northern part of the civil parish of Newtimber, which gets its name from the building.

References

External links
Official website

Grade I listed buildings in West Sussex
Country houses in West Sussex
Grade I listed houses